Andrea Atzeni (born 26 March 1991) is a professional Italian jockey based in England. He hails from the Mediterranean island of Sardinia and his family has no history of racing; his father is a farmer and his mother a dentist. Atzeni however expressed an interest in racing at a young age, competing in pony races in Sardinia. Aged 15, he moved to Milan and started working for Italian trainer Alduino Botti. Two years later he emigrated to England and joined the 'Prestige Place' stables of Alduino's son Marco in Newmarket.

Career
His first big success as a jockey came in the 2009 Cesarewitch Handicap, but he had to wait until 2012 for his first Group 1 win. This came on the Andreas Wöhler-trained Sortilege in the Premio Lydia Tesio ran at Capannelle Racecourse in Rome. Atzeni joined the stable of Roger Varian in 2013, where he was appointed stable jockey. This proved a fruitful move as he won his first British Group 1 race aboard the Varian trained Kingston Hill in the Racing Post Trophy, as well 120 winners for the season.

2014 brought even more success for Atzeni, winning the St. Leger and Moyglare Stud Stakes in the one weekend, followed by the Dewhurst Stakes and his second successive Racing Post Trophy the following month. Upon Jamie Spencer announcing his retirement (a decision he later revoked) Atzeni and Oisin Murphy were named joint jockeys to the potent Qatar Racing owned by Sheikh Fahad al Thani. He finished the season with 125 winners.

In 2015 he won the King George VI and Queen Elizabeth Stakes on the Luca Cumani-trained Postponed, as Adam Kirby lost the ride. He finished first across the line in the St. Leger for the second successive year on Qatar Racing's filly Simple Verse. A subsequent stewards' enquiry, saw Atzeni and Simple Verse demoted to second place for deemed interference with the second placed horse Bondi Beach. Qatar Racing successfully appealed against the stewards' decision and Simple Verse reclaimed the race. In October Atzeni guided Simple Verse to her second Group 1 in the British Champions Fillies' and Mares' Stakes, prior to her being named European Champion Stayer at the prestigious Cartier Racing Award. At the end of the 2015 season he took up the job of retained rider to Sheikh Mohammed Obaid Al Maktoum whom he rode Postponed to King George success for, thus leaving his job at Qatar Racing. Incidentally, Sheikh Mohammed Obaid Al Maktoum withdrew his entire string from Luca Cumani's Bedford House Stables and moved them to Roger Varian's  Kremlin House Stables. Subsequently Atzeni has become first-choice jockey for all Varian's horses, not just those owned by Sheikh Mohammed Obaid.

Major wins
 France
 Prix d'Ispahan - (1) - Zabeel Prince (2019)
 Prix Jean Romanet - (1) - Ajman Princess (2017)

 Italy
 Premio Lydia Tesio - (1) - Sortilege (2012)

 Germany
 Grosser Preis von Bayern - (1) - Seismos (2013)

 Great Britain
 British Champions Fillies' and Mares' Stakes - (1) - Simple Verse (2015)
 Coronation Cup - (2) - Postponed (2016), Defoe (2019)
 Dewhurst Stakes - (1) - Belardo (2014)
 Goodwood Cup - (2) - Stradivarius (2017, 2018)
 International Stakes - (1) - Postponed (2016)
 King George VI and Queen Elizabeth Stakes - (1) - Postponed (2015)
 Lockinge Stakes - (1) - Belardo (2016)
 Racing Post Trophy – (4) - Kingston Hill (2013), Elm Park (2014), Marcel (2015), Rivet (2016)
 St. Leger Stakes - (2) - Kingston Hill (2014), Simple Verse (2015)
 Haydock Sprint Cup  - (1) - Emaraaty Ana (2021)

 Ireland
 Irish Champion Stakes - (1) - Decorated Knight (2017)
 Moyglare Stud Stakes - (1) - Cursory Glance (2014)
 Pretty Polly Stakes - (1) - Nezwaah (2017)
 Tattersalls Gold Cup - (1) - Decorated Knight (2017)

 UAE
 Dubai Sheema Classic - (1) - Postponed (2016)
 Jebel Hatta - (1) - Decorated Knight (2017)

 Canada
 Canadian International Stakes - (2) - Desert Encounter (2018, 2019)
 E.P. Taylor Stakes - (1) - Sheikha Reika (2018)

References

1991 births
Living people
Italian British sportspeople
Italian jockeys
Italian emigrants to the United Kingdom
People of Sardinian descent
People from Newmarket, Suffolk